Pataura is a village development committee in Rautahat District in the Narayani Zone of south-eastern Nepal. At the time of the 1991 Nepal census it had a population of 4521 people living in 794 individual households.

See also
 Pataura, a village in Jaunpur, India
Ajay Verma lives here. He is very known popular here.

References

Populated places in Rautahat District